The Chota Nagpur Regiment was raised in 1891 as the Chota Nagpore Mounted Rifles and formed part of the Cavalry Reserve in the British Indian Army. It was renamed the Chota Nagpur Light Cavalry in 1910 then the Chota Nagpur Regiment in 1917. The regiment was disbanded subsequent to India's independence in 1947.

A light horse regiment was roughly equivalent to a battalion in strength (~ 400 men) and its troops typically fought as mounted infantry rather than traditional cavalry.

Military units and formations established in 1891
British Indian Army cavalry regiments